The NASLA (Nanostructured Anti-septical Coatings) Project involves four small and medium enterprises (SMEs) having one common technological problem: the need of antiseptic functionality for their products.
The project, funded by the European Union's Seventh Framework Programme, aims at creating new products and knowledge in antiseptic coatings suitable to be applied on a large variety of surfaces.

Introduction 

NASLA results are hoped to have a clear and immediate exploitation potential to improve or develop new products currently commercialized by the four SMEs: biomedical implants for DIPROMED, agro/food industry equipment for ALCE Calidad] and EASRETH, and personnel protective systems for Aero Sekur. As soon as the antiseptic functionality can be provided to SMEs products, the following new products are to be directly put on the market:

DIPROMED: biomedical implants

ALCE and EASRETH: new antiseptic coating on surfaces to be used in food handling and processing

Aero Sekur: new antiseptic textiles for personal protection systems (PPS)

ALCE Calidad (Spain), EASRETH (Greece), DIPROMED, and Aero Sekur (Italy) have limited access to research: the three research and development (R&D) partners (Politecnico di Torino, Italy, KTH and Bactiguard, Sweden) guarantee the outsourcing of research and development activity in top-quality research institutions.

This project is not focussed on solving short-term technological problems, but it is aimed to assist the four SMEs in acquiring technological know-how on a new antiseptic coating technology.

NASLA is a European research project for the benefit of SMEs and has received funding from the European Union's Seventh Framework Programme managed by Research Executive Agency (FP7/2007-2013, FP7/2007-2011) under grant agreement No. [262209].

NASLA research activity 

A new and reliable antiseptic coating will be designed, prepared and tested leading to the delivery of a new generation of goods with enhanced functionalities, currently not available on the market.

In particular a new silver nanoclusters–silica composites coating having anti-septical properties superior to those existing on the market is being developed. The coating is made of silver nanoclusters embedded in a silica matrix. The technique used to deposit the coating (RF sputtering) is suitable to almost every kind of substrate (polymers, metals, glasses, etc.).

The results achieved during the project are hoped to have a clear and immediate exploitation potential not only to improve or develop new products currently commercialized by the four SMEs, but also other applications such as : hospitals, schools, canteens, restaurants (and other areas where food is handled, processed or served), kitchen equipment production (cutlery and instrumentation for both private and professional use), beverages, the fishing industry, meat industries, and dairy industries.

See also
 sputter deposition
 nanoparticles

External links
 Video NASLA
 NASLA WEBSITE

.

Materials science